Eucereon balium is a moth of the subfamily Arctiinae. It was described by George Hampson in 1898. It is found in Honduras.

References

 

balium
Moths described in 1898